Sherman Smith (born November 1, 1954) is a former professional American football running back who played eight seasons for the Seattle Seahawks and San Diego Chargers between 1976 and 1983. He was also the  running backs coach for the Seahawks, as well as the former offensive coordinator for the Washington Redskins. After his playing days were over, he embarked upon a second career as a football coach, starting in high school, then college, and finally back in the National Football League (NFL) with the Houston Oilers / Tennessee Titans, the Redskins, and the Seahawks.

Early years
Smith played quarterback of the North High School football team in his native Youngstown, Ohio. After graduation, he attended Miami University in Ohio, playing the same position and leading the Redhawks to the Mid-American Conference title in each of his last three seasons, with a stellar record of 33-1-1.

He is a cousin of former NFL tight end Mike Cobb, whose playing career at Michigan State overlapped with Smith's at Miami.  Their respective teams faced each other in the 1975 season, with Michigan State winning 14-13 which was Miami's only regular season loss that year.

Professional playing career
Smith was drafted in the second round of the 1976 NFL Draft by the Seattle Seahawks as a running back. As a Seahawk, Smith was called "The Tank" in reference to the Sherman Tank because of his performance to run through tackles. He was the first offensive player picked by the new expansion team in its first season. He was the first Seahawk to rush for over 100 yards in a game when he ran for 124 yards against the Atlanta Falcons on November 7, 1976. Smith led the team in rushing in his first four seasons, eventually amassing 3,429 yards and 28 touchdowns in his seven years with the team. He also caught the ball 210 times for a total of 2,445 yards and 10 touchdowns.  He played sparingly for the San Diego Chargers in the 1983 season.

Coaching career
The following year, Smith began teaching and coaching at Redmond Junior High School, then at Redmond High School in the state of Washington. He became the running back coach at Miami University, his alma mater, in 1990. Between 1992 and 1994, he worked as the tight end and running back coach at the University of Illinois. In 1995, Smith joined the staff of the Houston Oilers (now the Tennessee Titans) as running back coach, where he helped mold Eddie George into one of the league's elite running backs. The organization promoted Smith in 2006, giving him the title of assistant head coach in addition to his continuing duties as running back coach.

In 2008, Smith left the Titans to join the Washington Redskins as offensive coordinator, reuniting with his former Seahawks teammate, Jim Zorn, who had been named head coach of the Redskins.

After the 2009 season, Zorn was fired and Mike Shanahan was named as the new head coach in Washington. Smith was not retained on staff by Shanahan. Shortly thereafter Smith was reunited with his former team, the Seattle Seahawks, when hired as a position coach (running backs). He won his first Super Bowl title when the Seahawks defeated the Denver Broncos in Super Bowl XLVIII.

As of February 17, 2017 Smith was no longer with the Seattle Seahawks due to a change to the position made by the head coach Pete Carroll.

Personal life
Smith's children are Shavonne, Sherman and Deland. Deland is the University of Notre Dame running backs coach Deland McCullough. The two had known each other since Smith was recruiting McCullough to the RedHawks when the latter was 17, but only learned they were related in 2017, as depicted in the Kendrick Brothers 2021 film Show Me the Father. His brother was former CFL All-Star Darrell K. Smith.

References

1954 births
Living people
Players of American football from Youngstown, Ohio
American football running backs
Miami RedHawks football players
Seattle Seahawks players
San Diego Chargers players
Washington Redskins coaches
Seattle Seahawks coaches
Houston Oilers coaches
Tennessee Titans coaches
High school football coaches in Washington (state)
Illinois Fighting Illini football coaches